Ants in the Pantry is a 1936 short subject directed by Preston Black starring American slapstick comedy team The Three Stooges (Moe Howard, Larry Fine and Curly Howard). It is the 12th entry in the series released by Columbia Pictures starring the comedians, who released 190 shorts for the studio between 1934 and 1959.

Plot

The Stooges are pest exterminators who, for want of business, also provide the pests. They select an upscale mansion where a high society dinner party is being held. With gleeful amorality, they unleash a plague of mice, moths, and ants, literally releasing small animals everywhere on purpose,  then are predictably hired to clean up their own mess, without interrupting the party, dressed as guests. Things go according to plan until Larry and Curly hastily conceal mice-hungry cats inside an upright piano which is then played during a recital of Johann Strauss II's "Blue Danube Waltz." The chaos is compounded when a mouse enters the piano, agitating the cats. The Stooges are forced to get the offending pest and the cats out, destroying the piano in its entirety. To prevent the hostess from being socially humiliated, the guests are told the boys are the entertainment and find their antics absolutely hilarious. The Stooges are invited to join in the fox hunt, where Curly blows his nose, making a sound, which Larry thinks that it is the sound of a bugle, call, that a fox is in sight, instead, Curly picks up a live skunk, and puts it in the bag, causing Moe, Larry to and one of the horses faint to the ground, being the result of the skunk's nasty odor.

Production notes
Ants in the Pantry was filmed on December 11–14, 1935; the film title is a pun on the phrase "ants in the pants." Moe Howard later recalled that a nest of ants actually worked their way into his pants:

Veteran voice actor Clarence Nash, most famous for doing Donald Duck, did the sounds of the cats in the piano.

Vesey O'Davoren appeared as Gawkins.

Ants in the Pantry was remade with Shemp Howard in 1951 as Pest Man Wins.

References

External links 
 
 
 Ants in the Pantry at threestooges.net
  Ants in the Pantry via YouTube

1936 films
Columbia Pictures short films
American black-and-white films
1936 comedy films
The Three Stooges films
American slapstick comedy films
1930s English-language films
1930s American films